Kuzinia is a genus of mites in the family Acaridae.

Species
 Kuzinia evae Putatunda, Aggarwal & Kapil, 1984
 Kuzinia morsei (El-Banhawy & Abou-Awad, 1990)
 Kuzinia sciurina Volgin, 1978
 Kuzinia woykei Putatunda, Aggarwal & Kapil, 1984
 Kuzinia laevis (Dujardin, 1849)

References

Acaridae